The World According to Garp is John Irving's fourth novel, about a man, born out of wedlock to a feminist leader, who grows up to be a writer. Published in 1978, the book was a bestseller for several years. It was a finalist for the National Book Award for Fiction in 1979, and its first paperback edition won the Award the following year.

A movie adaptation of the novel starring Robin Williams was released in 1982, with a screenplay written by Steve Tesich.

BBC Radio 4's Classic Serial broadcast a three-part adaptation of the novel by Linda Marshall Griffiths in January 2014. The production was directed by Nadia Molinari and featured Miranda Richardson as Jenny, Lee Ingleby as Garp, Jonathan Keeble as Roberta and Lyndsey Marshal as Helen.

On 3 November 2015, Irving revealed that he'd been approached by HBO and Warner Brothers to reconstruct The World According to Garp as a miniseries. He described the project as being in the early stages.

According to the byline of a self-penned, 20 February 2017 essay for The Hollywood Reporter, Irving completed his teleplay for the five-part series based on The World According to Garp.

Synopsis 
The novel is about the life of T.S. Garp. His mother, Jenny Fields, is a strong-willed nurse who wants a child but not a husband. She encounters a dying ball turret gunner known only as Technical Sergeant Garp, who was severely brain damaged in combat. Jenny nurses Garp, observing his infantile state and almost perpetual autonomic sexual arousal. Unconstrained by convention and driven by her desire for a child, Jenny rapes the brain-damaged Garp once, impregnates herself and names the resulting son "T.S." (a name derived from "Technical Sergeant", but consisting of just initials). Jenny raises young Garp alone, taking a position at the all-boys Steering School in New England.

Garp grows up, becoming interested in sex, wrestling, and writing fiction—three topics in which his mother has little interest. After his graduation in 1961, his mother takes him to Vienna, where he writes his first novella. At the same time, his mother begins writing her autobiography, A Sexual Suspect.  After Jenny and Garp return to Steering, Garp marries Helen, the wrestling coach's daughter, and begins his family—he a struggling writer, she a teacher of English. The publication of A Sexual Suspect makes his mother famous.  She becomes a feminist icon, because feminists view her book as a manifesto of a woman who does not care to bind herself to a man, and who chooses to raise a child on her own.  She nurtures and supports women traumatized by men, among them the Ellen Jamesians, a group of women named after an eleven-year-old girl whose tongue was cut off by her rapists to silence her. The members of the group cut off their own tongues in solidarity with the girl (the girl herself opposes this tongue cutting).

Garp becomes a devoted parent, wrestling with anxiety for the safety of his children and a desire to keep them safe from the dangers of the world. He and his family inevitably experience dark and violent events through which the characters change and grow. Garp learns (often painfully) from the women in his life (including transgender ex-football player Roberta Muldoon), who are struggling to become more tolerant in the face of intolerance. The story contains a great deal of (in the words of Garp's fictional teacher) "lunacy and sorrow".

The novel contains several narratives: Garp's first piece of fiction, a short story entitled The Pension Grillparzer; Vigilance, an essay; and the first chapter of his third novel, The World According to Bensenhaver. The book also contains some motifs that appear in other Irving novels: bears, New England, Vienna, hotels, wrestling, a person who prefers abstinence over sex, and adultery.

Background 
John Irving's mother, Frances Winslow, had not been married at the time of his conception, and Irving never met his biological father. As a child, he was not told anything about his father, and he told his mother that unless she gave him some information about his biological father, in his writing he would invent the father and the circumstances of how she got pregnant. Winslow would reply "Go ahead, dear."

In 1981, Time magazine quoted the novelist's mother as saying "There are parts of Garp that are too explicit for me."

Notes

References

External links 
 John Irving discusses The World According to Garp on the BBC - link is dead World Book Club
 Photos of the first edition of The World According to Garp
 New York Times book review, by Christopher Lehmann-Haupt, April 13, 1978

1978 American novels
1970s LGBT novels
Adultery in novels
American LGBT novels
American novels adapted into films
E. P. Dutton books
Metafictional novels
National Book Award for Fiction winning works
Novels about writers
Novels by John Irving
Novels with transgender themes
Phillips Exeter Academy